Piedmont is a region in Northwest Italy.

In physical geography, piedmont denotes a region of foothills in a mountain range.

Piedmont may also refer to:

Regions in the United States
Piedmont (ecoregion)
Piedmont (United States), eastern region
Central North Carolina, the Piedmont region of North Carolina
Colorado Piedmont, Colorado region
Piedmont Crescent, a geographical phenomenon of urban areas arranged in a crescent shape in North Carolina
Piedmont Triad, a region centered on three cities in North Carolina

Populated places

Canada 
Piedmont, Nova Scotia
Piedmont, Quebec

United States 
Piedmont, Alabama
Piedmont, California
Piedmont, Georgia, a List of places in Georgia (U.S. state) (I–R)place in Georgia
Piedmont, Kansas
Piedmont, Missouri
Piedmont, Ohio
Piedmont, Oklahoma
Piedmont, Portland, Oregon, a neighborhood in Portland, Oregon
Piedmont, South Carolina, a census-designated place
Piedmont, South Dakota
Piedmont, Virginia (disambiguation)
Piedmont, Washington
Piedmont, West Virginia
Piedmont, Mercer County, West Virginia
Piedmont, Wyoming

Colleges
Piedmont University, in Demorest, Georgia
Piedmont Community College, in Rixboro, North Carolina
Piedmont Technical College, with several locations in South Carolina
Central Piedmont Community College, in Charlotte, North Carolina
Georgia Piedmont Technical College, in Clarkston, Georgia
Piedmont Virginia Community College, in Albemarle County, Virginia
Piedmont Baptist College, in Winston-Salem, North Carolina
South Piedmont Community College, in Anson and Union counties, North Carolina
Western Piedmont Community College, in Morganton, North Carolina

People
Prince of Piedmont
James of Piedmont (1315–1367), Lord of Piedmont from 1334
Louis of Piedmont (1364–1418), Lord of Piedmont and titular Prince of Achaea from 1402
Matt Piedmont (born 1970), American writer
Nicolaas Piemont (1644–1709), Dutch Golden Age landscape painter

Transportation
Piedmont (automobile), a car made by the Piedmont Motor Car Company of Lynchburg, Virginia
Piedmont (train), an Amtrak passenger train in North Carolina
Piedmont Airlines, a regional airline operating under the name American Eagle
Piedmont Airlines (1948–89), an airline that was merged into US Air

Other uses
Piedmont (Greenwood, Virginia), a historic house and farm
Piedmont (minor league baseball)
Piedmont (wine)
Piedmont blues or "Piedmont fingerstyle", a style of blues guitar playing
Piedmont League, defunct minor league baseball organization
Kingdom of Piedmont-Sardinia, the name given to the possessions of the House of Savoy in 1723
Piedmont, Arizona, fictional setting for part of the miniseries The Andromeda Strain
Ice piedmont, a geographic feature

See also

Piedmont Avenue (disambiguation)
Piedmont Council
Piedmont High School (disambiguation)
Piedmont Hotel

Piemonte (disambiguation)
Beskidian Piedmont (disambiguation)